In general relativity, Eddington–Finkelstein coordinates are a pair of coordinate systems for a Schwarzschild geometry (e.g. a spherically symmetric black hole) which are adapted to radial null geodesics.  Null geodesics are the worldlines of photons; radial ones are those that are moving directly towards or away from the central mass. They are named for Arthur Stanley Eddington and David Finkelstein. Although they appear to have inspired the idea, neither ever wrote down these coordinates or the metric in these coordinates. Roger Penrose seems to have been the first to write down the null form but credits it to the above paper by Finkelstein, and, in his Adams Prize essay later that year, to Eddington and Finkelstein. Most influentially, Misner, Thorne and Wheeler, in their book Gravitation, refer to the null coordinates by that name.

One advantage of this coordinate system is that it shows that the apparent singularity at the Schwarzschild radius is only a coordinate singularity and is not a true physical singularity. While this fact was recognized by Finkelstein, it was not recognized (or at least not commented on) by Eddington, whose primary purpose was to compare and contrast the spherically symmetric solutions in Whitehead's theory of gravitation and Einstein's version of the theory of relativity.

Schwarzschild metric

where

is the standard Riemannian metric of the unit 2-sphere. 

Note the conventions being used here are the metric signature of (− + + +) and the natural units where c = 1 is the dimensionless speed of light, G the gravitational constant, and M is the characteristic mass of the Schwarzschild geometry.

Tortoise coordinate
Eddington–Finkelstein coordinates are founded upon the tortoise coordinate – a name that comes from one of Zeno of Elea's paradoxes on an imaginary footrace between "swift-footed" Achilles and a tortoise.

The tortoise coordinate  is defined:

so as to satisfy:

The tortoise coordinate  approaches  as  approaches the Schwarzschild radius .

When some probe (such as a light ray or an observer) approaches a black hole event horizon, its Schwarzschild time coordinate grows infinite. The outgoing null rays in this coordinate system have an infinite change in t on travelling out from the horizon. The tortoise coordinate is intended to grow infinite at the appropriate rate such as to cancel out this singular behaviour in coordinate systems constructed from it.

The increase in the time coordinate to infinity as one approaches the event horizon is why information could never be received back from any probe that is sent through such an event horizon. This is despite the fact that the probe itself can nonetheless travel past the horizon. It is also why the space-time metric of the black hole, when expressed in Schwarzschild coordinates, becomes singular at the horizon – and thereby fails to be able to fully chart the trajectory of an infalling probe.

Metric
The ingoing Eddington–Finkelstein coordinates are obtained by replacing the coordinate  t with the new coordinate . In these coordinates, the Schwarzschild metric can be written as 

where again 

is the standard Riemannian metric on the unit radius 2-sphere.

Likewise, the outgoing Eddington–Finkelstein coordinates are obtained by replacing t with the null coordinate . The metric is then given by

In both these coordinate systems the metric is explicitly non-singular at the Schwarzschild radius (even though one component vanishes at this radius, the determinant of the metric is still non-vanishing and the inverse metric has no terms which diverge there.)

Note that for radial null rays, v=const or =const or equivalently =const or u=const we have  dv/dr and du/dr approach 0 and ±2 at large r, not ±1 as one might expect if one regarded u or v as "time". When plotting Eddington–Finkelstein diagrams, surfaces of constant u or v are usually drawn as cones, with u or v constant lines drawn as sloping at  45 degree  rather than as planes (see for instance Box 31.2 of MTW). Some sources instead take , corresponding to planar surfaces in such diagrams. In terms of this  the metric becomes

which is Minkowskian at large r. (This was the coordinate time and metric that both Eddington and Finkelstein presented in their papers.)

The Eddington–Finkelstein coordinates are still incomplete and can be extended. For example, the outward traveling timelike geodesics defined by (with τ the proper time)

has v(τ) → −∞ as τ → 2GM. Ie, this timelike geodesic has a finite proper length into the past where it comes out of the horizon (r = 2GM) when v becomes minus infinity. The regions for finite v and r < 2GM is a different region from finite u and r < 2GM. The horizon r = 2GM and finite v (the black hole horizon) is different from that with r = 2GM and finite u (the white hole horizon) .

The metric in Kruskal–Szekeres coordinates covers all of the extended Schwarzschild spacetime in a single coordinate system. Its chief disadvantage is that in those coordinates the metric depends on both the time and space coordinates. In Eddington–Finkelstein, as in Schwarzschild coordinates, the metric is independent of the "time" (either t in Schwarzschild, or u or v in the various Eddington–Finkelstein coordinates), but none of these cover the complete spacetime.

The Eddington–Finkelstein coordinates have some similarity to the Gullstrand–Painlevé coordinates in that both are time independent, and penetrate (are regular across) either the future (black hole) or the past (white hole) horizons. Both are not diagonal (the hypersurfaces of constant "time" are not orthogonal to the hypersurfaces of constant r.) The latter have a flat spatial metric, while the former's spatial ("time" constant) hypersurfaces are null and have the same metric as that of a null cone in Minkowski space ( in flat spacetime).

See also
Schwarzschild coordinates
Kruskal–Szekeres coordinates
Lemaître coordinates
Gullstrand–Painlevé coordinates
Vaidya metric

References

Coordinate charts in general relativity